The 1977 Aryamehr Cup (Persian: جام آریامهر ۱۳۵۵) was a men's professional tennis tournament played on outdoor clay courts in Tehran in Iran. The event was part of the 1977 Colgate-Palmolive Grand Prix as a Five Star category event. It was the sixth and final edition of the tournament and was held from 3 October through 9 October 1977. Guillermo Vilas won the singles title.

Finals

Singles
 Guillermo Vilas defeated  Eddie Dibbs 6–2, 6–4, 1–6, 6–1
 It was Vilas' 12th singles title of the year and the 31st of his career.

Doubles
 Ion Țiriac /  Guillermo Vilas defeated  Bob Hewitt /  Frew McMillan 1–6, 6–1, 6–4
 It was Tiriac's 4th title of the year and the 16th of his career. It was Vilas' 3rd title of the year and the 11th of his career.

References

External links
ITF tournament edition details

Aryamehr Cup
1977 Grand Prix (tennis)